The 1986 National Soccer League season was the sixty-third season under the National Soccer League (NSL) name. The season began in late May 1986 and concluded in early October 1986 with the NSL Championship final where Toronto Italia defeated Toronto Blizzard. Though the Blizzard would still manage to secure a treble after finishing first in the standings to claim the regular-season title, and defeating London Marconi for the NSL Ontario Cup. Toronto would earn the treble by defeating Vancouver Columbus Italia for the NSL Canadian Championship. The fourth piece of silverware was claimed by the Blizzard after defeating Luso Stars of the Quebec National Soccer League (LNSQ) for the NSL Canada Cup.

Overview 
As the formation of the Canadian Soccer Association's (CSA) sanctioned national professional league was becoming more apparent, and with its policy of no ethnic associated clubs the National Soccer League (NSL) began organizing an alternative model to the CSA's version of a nationwide league. The newly appointed NSL commissioner and Toronto Italia owner Rocco Lofranco began the process of formalizing affiliated agreements with professional leagues throughout the country to implement a national model with a regional format. The regional format would consist of separate regional leagues with independent schedules with the regional champions qualifying for a postseason tournament, which would ultimately determine the national champion. The primary purpose of the regional format was to reduce the costly travel expenses associated with a national league employing an interlocking schedule. The NSL's presence was successfully established in British Columbia through an affiliated agreement with the Pacific Rim Soccer League and in Quebec with the creation of the Quebec National Soccer League (LNSQ) in 1986.   

As the NSL expanded into British Columbia, and Quebec each league supplied their regional champions in a tournament for the NSL Canadian Championship intending to provide a Canadian representative to the CONCACAF Champions' Cup. The previous time a Canadian club competed in the Champions' Cup was in the 1976 CONCACAF Champions' Cup represented by Toronto Italia. Several proposals and changes to the league's infrastructure were approved at the annual general meeting with the acceptance of the Petro Canada Soccer League as the NSL's developmental league, and the renaming of Toronto Dinamo to the Toronto Blizzard. All teams from the previous season returned with Windsor AC Roma renaming themselves as Windsor Wheels in an attempt to appeal to a wider audience.

Teams

Coaching changes

Final standings

Playoffs

Semifinals

Finals

Cup  
The cup tournament was a separate contest from the rest of the season, in which all eight teams took part. All the matches were separate from the regular season, and the teams were grouped into two separate divisions. The two winners in the group stage would advance to a singles match for the Cup. The winner of the league cup would face the Quebec National Soccer League (LNSQ), and Pacific Rim Soccer League cup titleholders for the NSL Canada Cup.

Finals

NSL Canadian Championship 
Since the 1986 season, a joint effort was conducted between the Pacific Rim Soccer League of British Columbia, National Soccer League, and the Quebec National Soccer League to provide a national champion. The original intention of the national tournament was to provide a potential Canadian representative for the CONCACAF Champions' Cup. The previous time a Canadian club competed in the Champions' Cup was in the 1976 CONCACAF Champions' Cup represented by Toronto Italia. Their regional champions would face each other in a single-elimination tournament with a single match for the championship.

Semifinals

Finals

NSL Canada Cup 
The NSL Canada Cup was a separate tournament intended to crown a national league cup champion. The participating teams were the league cup titleholders from the Pacific Rim Soccer League of British Columbia, the National Soccer League, and the Quebec National Soccer League. The format of the competition was a single-elimination tournament with a single match for the national cup.

Semifinal

Final

References

External links
RSSSF CNSL page
thecnsl.com - 1986 season

 
1986–87 domestic association football leagues
National Soccer League
1986